Ionex, or IONEX, is a name for ion exchange  , or for some of the ion exchange resins used for that purpose. 
 IONEX is an IONospheric map EXchange ASCII format for two- and three-dimensional total electron count value maps.
 Ionex, is a subsidiary of Kymco which builds electric vehicles